The Lover Boy of Bahawalpur: How the Pulwama Case was Cracked is a non-fiction book written by Rahul Pandita and published in 2021. The book tells the story of a team of National Investigation Agency (NIA) sleuths cracking the 2019 Pulwama attack case. The "lover boy" referred to in the title is Mohammad Umar Farooq (son of Ibrahim Athar, one of the five terrorists who had hijacked the Indian Airlines Flight IC 814 in December 1999), nephew of Jaish founder Masood Azhar and a key accused in the case.  He was killed during an encounter a month after Pulwama attack. Rakesh Balwal, the Jammu and Kashmir head of the NIA was tasked with the 2019 Pulwama attack case probe at that time.

Background
NIA managed to connect the dots at the time of the abrogation of Article 370 when a mobile phone full of lustful messages was recovered after an encounter that killed Umar Farooq.

Key people involved
  Mohammad Umar Farooq alias Idrees Bhai, nephew of Jaish founder Masood Azhar 
 Adil Ahmad Dar, suicide bomber of 2019 Pulwama attack 
 Sameer Ahmed Dar aka Hanjila Jihadi (cousin of Adil Ahmad Dar)
 Mohammad Ismail Alvi alias Saifullah/ Adnan / Lamboo
 Ashiq Ahmed Nengroo
 Ammar Alvi , Umar Farooq's uncle
 Noor Mohammed Tantray alias Noor Trali 
 Insha Jan

Reception
The Wire journalist Karan Thapar wrote of the book, "Pandita has an incredible story to tell which some may find hard to believe. Others may be sceptical [...] But there will also be many who will accept Pandita’s detailed story."

See also
 Ghazi Baba

References

External links
 tunnel
 absconder

2021 non-fiction books
Terrorism in India
Juggernaut Books books